Katherine "Katie" Fitch is a fictional character in the television series Skins, played by Megan "Meg" Prescott. She is introduced in the third series. Her twin sister Emily is played by Megan's real-life twin Kathryn "Kat" Prescott

Characterisation
Katie—along with identical twin Emily—was born in 1992 to Jenna Fitch, a beautician turned wedding planner and Rob Fitch, the gym owner of "Fitch Fitness". Being the older twin by a few minutes Katie is notably more aggressive, controlling, and extroverted in contrast to younger twin Emily's quieter nature. During their childhood she and Emily created a secret language that only they can understand called "Twin". In the first episode of series three Katie states with pride that she has never been without a boyfriend since age seven. On her official Skins page, she discusses the difference between her and her sister.

Considered by many to be shallow, self-centred, and somewhat ruthless—especially towards Naomi Campbell, JJ Jones, Effy Stonem, and her sister Emily—Katie is isolated from the gang for much of her first year at Roundview College, for which she is mainly on a quest for popularity during series three. Though she eventually forms a relationship with Freddie McClair, the couple is short lived after she suspects his feelings for Effy, where an argument that leads to an accident between her and Effy nearly threatens her life. This event would prove to be a life altering experience for Katie, whose sensitive, highly insecure nature, and fear of being alone is revealed.

By the fourth series Katie's personality develops significantly. She decides to get a responsible boyfriend and direct her energy into her mother's wedding planning business "Let's Get Fitched", though upon learning that she is infertile, she begins to question the future she'd always imagined for herself as well as her own identity. However, after coming to an understanding with her parents and reconciling with Emily (while tolerating Naomi), and gaining friendships with Thomas, Pandora, Effy and Freddie, Katie becomes fully integrated into the gang and more openly expresses a caring side.

Katie has also kept her outspoken personality, most vocally standing up for Kanye West in the aftermath of the 2009 MTV Video Music Awards.

Character history

Series 3
She is initially quite mean to Emily, as she tries to shed her twin, establishing her individuality, and seemingly trampling on her sister as she does so. She does it to the point where Effy comments that Katie treats Emily like a "doormat". She is dating a footballer named Danny. She wants to be popular and tries to befriend Effy Stonem, who seems to be the most popular girl in school. She is deeply homophobic against Naomi, as she thinks that Naomi forced herself on Emily (when in fact Emily initiated the kiss).

During Cook's birthday party, Emily tells Katie that she was the one who kissed Naomi, not the other way around. Later, during Pandora's birthday party, Katie sees Naomi and Emily kissing in a jump house, and is shaken. Soon, her boyfriend, Danny, and all his friends, show up and crash Pandora's party, and turn it into a mess. Eventually, Effy loses her queen bee status to Katie, something she revels in. She enters into a sexual relationship with Freddie after dumping Danny, partly because she likes him but partly to get back at Effy. After Emily and JJ catch her having sex with Freddie, JJ accidentally reveals Emily's homosexuality to her, and this eventually awakens her to the fact that her sister is gay.

During a party in the woods, Katie tries to be the head of the party but fails due to Effy finding shrooms and her closeness to the rest of the gang. Katie makes it very apparent that she doesn't want Effy there, After Cook crashes the party and reveals that Effy doesn't want him anymore, Katie grows more anxious that Effy instead wants Freddie, leading to her heading off in the woods alone. Cook continues and reveals to Effy he has been sleeping with Pandora repeatedly which also after which Effy starts to suffer from a bad trip. It's then she meets Katie again; what happens next is never really clarified as Effy is tripping and the scene is told from her point of view. Katie goes from comforting her to telling her about bugs in her hair, then acting as if this never happened. Katie then breaks down in tears and begs Effy to not take Freddie from her, but when she tries to comfort her, Katie becomes hostile. Claiming that she couldn't take him if she tried, she tackles Effy to the floor and starts rubbing her face in the mud before flipping her over, strangling and slapping her. This causes Effy to freak out and grab the closest thing she could find, a rock, into Katie's head, knocking her unconscious. Effy returns to the camp and has sex with Freddie, but the next morning when people question Katie's whereabouts she says nothing, ashamed and unsure of what to do. Eventually Effy calls an unknown person (presumably the police or an ambulance) and requests they come and get Katie.

Katie's injuries (9 stitches in her head as well as various bruises) make her too embarrassed to leave the house, so Emily disguises herself as her sister and sits for her exam. Katie ignores Emily when her sister comes out to her, telling her "you're not gay, you're just stupid". She later confronts Naomi after Emily comes out to her parents, telling her to stay away from Emily. She tells Naomi that Emily slept with JJ while she and Naomi were having problems; thus causing Emily and Naomi to fight. This enables Emily and Katie to go to the school ball with JJ and Freddie (respectively). However, Katie acknowledges to Freddie that she knows she is second choice to Effy. Eventually, Naomi shows up at the ball and Katie pulls her aside and reminds her to stop talking to Emily. However, Emily overhears what Katie did and they both begin to fight. Emily gains the upper hand but doesn't hurt her sister, instead picking her up and saying that she loves Katie, but she isn't her; Emily is gay and is in love with Naomi. Katie finally seems to accept that her sister is her own person.

Series 4
Katie is seen at a huge party at the club that Thomas works, she is present when the girl Sophia kills herself after taking a bad batch of MDMA. Katie now has a new boyfriend, Sam. Later, Emily, unable to understand why their mother can't accept her homosexuality and her relationship with Naomi, decides to move out leaving Katie heartbroken. Katie tries to make her stay, even using their secret language, but Emily leaves. It is revealed that their father had lost his gym, making him bankrupt.

Later, Katie is working with her mother on her new wedding planning business - and their first client is Brandy - a fellow Bristol Rovers WAG with zero class and a mother with bad manners. Katie, realising that she hasn't had a menstrual cycle for some time, goes to the doctor to see if she is pregnant. The doctor tells her that she isn't pregnant, but going through a premature menopause; thus she won't be able to have children. A shocked Katie leaves the clinic and dumps Sam. After trying to reach Emily, she heads home to tell her mum. Before she's given the chance to talk about her problem, her mum makes a discovery whilst on the phone to the bank - the Fitch family are broke and have lost everything. And Rob's been hiding the evidence under the couch. Jenna loses it and Katie's left consoling a confused James Fitch. When Katie gets to Brandy’s hen party theme's been changed - by her ex-boyfriend Danny's new girlfriend. She soldiers on until Brandy's mum reveals to everyone that Brandy's pregnant.

Then Katie sees Effy and Freddie. Colliding with Effy once again, Katie's almost at the point where she fights back. Then Danny's girlfriend humiliates her and she retaliates. Storming on to the dance floor, Katie punches her, and she's thrown out and sacked as the wedding planner. Outside, Effy tries to console Katie. Katie reveals her plans for the future, which aren't so certain now, and she doesn't know who she is anymore. Effy and Katie bond and it seem to strike up a friendship. Katie heads home and the bailiffs arrive to repossess their home and they're left with one option - do a runner with as much stuff as they can. They have nowhere to go - they've got nothing. So Katie suggests Naomi's, and is forced to ask her for help.

It's when Emily arrives home after a night out, that Katie realises things are not well with Naomi and Emily. Emily is angry with everyone and out of control. Emily throws an impromptu BBQ with revellers from the night before, Katie watches Emily from her chair while talking to Naomi and Effy. Naomi clearly isn't happy and makes it clear this isn't the first time Emily has behaved like this. When Emily's request for more pills is declined, she grows angrier and out of spite, kisses a girl in front of everyone. Katie watches on in shock as Emily then runs at Naomi and pushes her into the paddling pool. Fed up with hiding and secrets, Naomi announces to everyone that she sold Sophia the drugs and also had slept with her. This seems to break Emily as she starts crying before confronting both her mother and Katie, the later slapping her before walking off.

Thomas gets locked in the bathroom as Katie's having a bath. Katie wants to make sure she's still attractive, and they start to kiss. They stop kissing, and Katie asks him if he thinks she is a bitch, because she feels like many people see her that way. However, Thomas tells her that she is honest, even if it hurts people to hear it. Katie then tells Thomas the reason for her insecurity (her not being able to have children) and asks him if he think boys will still want to marry her, even if she can't give them children. Thomas replies that any man would be lucky to have her. This event causes Katie to feel better about herself, and she decides to help reunite Thomas and Pandora to make him happy too. Fresh from her bath, Katie finds Emily huddled on a mattress on the floor and comforts her. The Fitch family return to their old home to collect Jenna. Katie goes in first and tells her she can't have children. Katie tells her she's not going to ever be the same as her mother and she wants her mother to love her no matter what. She tells her mother to stop pushing them away; her mother takes Katie's advice thus reuniting the family.

Later, Katie is seen at Effy's "goodbye party", saying that she doesn't want to party with goths. She tells Freddie that she doesn't know where Effy is. Later, Katie is dancing in the Judgment Day Parade, and sees a freaked out Effy (who is falling deeper into her psychotic depression) and pulls her out from the crowd. She signals to Freddie to get her, as Effy was visibly shaken. The two then take her to Freddie's grandad's nursing home and he suggests Katie take her to the cafeteria to get some tea. As Freddie is talking to his grandad, Katie bursts into the room and scaredly tells him that Effy won't come out of the toilet. Freddie races there and is quick enough to save Effy who has just cut her wrists.

Katie then seems to spend the majority of her time at the psychiatric hospital Effy is being kept in following her suicide attempt. Along with Pandora, they cheer her up with talking and a song Pandora has written. On the bus heading home afterwards, Katie starts her plan to help Thomas and Pandora, so drops hints about Thomas tutoring her one-on-one for French, hoping to spark up some jealousy; it doesn't seem to work though. When they are having their lesson however, what Katie doesn't realise is that Thomas is actually just making her repeat dirty phrases. They both know Pandora is outside but what they're not aware of is that she took various exams in secret and got an A* on her French exam so can understand everything. After she has run away, Katie asks just what she has actually been saying to which Thomas gestures towards her chest. As they are play-fighting, Katie kisses Thomas again before pulling away as she knows that he loves Pandora.

Katie received two C´s and a B from her A-levels.

Arriving with Emily at Freddie's shed, Katie witnesses Naomi and Emily finally make up properly, and in her last scenes she is drinking shots with everyone and having fun.

References

External links
Katie Fitch on the official E4 Skins site
Katie Fitch Character Blog on E4 Skins site
 Katie Fitch on Myspace

Skins (British TV series) characters
Fictional English people
Fictional English people of Scottish descent
Television characters introduced in 2009
Fictional identical twins
British female characters in television
Female characters in television
Teenage characters in television